National Highway 339B, commonly referred to as NH 339B is a national highway in  India. It is a spur road of National Highway 39. Bamitha to khajwa. NH-339B traverses the state of Madhya Pradesh in India.

Route 
Bamitha - Khajuraho - Rajnagar - Khajwa

Junctions  

  Terminal near Bamitha.

See also 

 List of National Highways in India
 List of National Highways in India by state

References

External links 

 NH 339B on OpenStreetMap

National highways in India
National Highways in Madhya Pradesh